Charles Caesar may refer to:

 Sir Charles Caesar (1590–1642), English judge, Master of the Rolls
 Sir Charles Caesar (1653–1694), English Member of Parliament (MP) for Hertford and Hertfordshire (UK Parliament constituency)
Charles Caesar (Treasurer of the Navy) (1673–1741), English Tory MP, Treasurer of the Navy 1711–1714